Sethe may refer to:
 Seeth-Ekholt, municipality in Germany
 Kurt Sethe (1869–1934), archaeologist
 Paul Sethe (1901–1967) was a historian and journalist for Frankfurter Allgemeine Zeitung, Der Spiegel, Die Welt, and Die Zeit
 Sethe, the main character in Toni Morrison's 1987 Pulitzer Prize–winning novel Beloved